Meri (an acronym for Mahaneh Radikali Yisraeli, lit. Israeli Radical Camp) was a small radical left-wing political party in Israel. It was founded in the 1960s as HaOlam HaZeh – Koah Hadash by Uri Avnery, editor of HaOlam HaZeh.

History
The party was founded by Uri Avnery, editor and owner of the anti-establishment HaOlam HaZeh news magazine, and was the first major radical party in Israel. It surprisingly passed the electoral threshold in the 1965 election, gaining 1.2% of the vote and one seat, taken by Avnery.

The 1969 election saw the party pick up two seats, with fellow HaOlam HaZeh journalist and owner Shalom Cohen taking the second seat. However, disagreements between Avnery and Cohen led to the party breaking up on 4 January 1972. Cohen served the remainder of the Knesset session as an independent MK, whilst on 3 July 1973 Avnery renamed the party Meri.

The party included members of Aki and former members of Siah on its list for the 1973 elections, but it failed to cross the electoral threshold and Avnery lost his seat. Prior to the 1977 elections, the party merged with Moked, the Independent Socialist Faction and some members of the Black Panthers to form the Left Camp of Israel. The new party won two seats, which were rotated between five party members, including Avnery. However, they failed to win any seats in the 1981 elections and did not reappear in the Knesset.

References

External links
 Ha-olam Hazeh - Koah Hadash Knesset website
 Radical Camp of Israel (Meri) Knesset website

Far-left politics in Israel
Socialist parties in Israel
Far-left political parties
Defunct political parties in Israel